Ernest Davis may refer to:
 Ernie Davis (1939–1963), American football running back
 Sir Ernest Davis (brewer) (1872–1962), New Zealand brewer and mayor of Auckland
 Ernest Davis (professor), Professor of Computer Science at New York University
 Ernest D. Davis, mayor of Mount Vernon, New York

See also
Ernest Davies (disambiguation)